Jack L. Turban is an American psychiatrist and writer who researches LGBTQ health, with a focus on the mental health of transgender youth. His writing has appeared in The New York Times, The Washington Post, and Vox. He is an assistant professor of child and adolescent psychiatry at The University of California San Francisco and affiliate faculty in health policy at The Philip R. Lee Institute for Health Policy Studies.

Early life and education 
Turban was born in Pittsburgh, Pennsylvania. Fearful of violence from his father, he did not come out as gay until he attended college. He later wrote in The New England Journal of Medicine about his early experiences of childhood homophobia and how they influenced his experience of medical education. Turban attended Harvard College where he studied neuroscience, then earned his medical and master of health science degrees from Yale School of Medicine. He completed psychiatry residency at McLean Hospital (Harvard Medical School) in 2020 and child and adolescent psychiatry fellowship at Stanford University School of Medicine in 2022.

Career 
Turban is an assistant professor of child and adolescent psychiatry and health policy at the University of California, San Francisco. He has published studies showing that gender identity conversion therapies (attempts to make transgender people cisgender) are widespread in the US and associated with suicide attempts. His research has shown that access to gender-affirming medical care (puberty blockers and gender-affirming hormones) during adolescence is linked to better mental health outcomes in adulthood, though the ability of his study to show this causal link has been disputed. He has also been one of the few researchers to publish on the topic of gender de-transition, including in the academic literature.

Turban has been critical of Wall Street Journal writer Abigail Shrier's book Irreversible Damage, which alleges that a recent surge in adolescents becoming transgender is taking place, largely due to social contagion. He claimed that the book misinterpreted and omitted important scientific evidence about young people and gender identity. He subsequently co-authored a study arguing that gender dysphoria in children was not caused by social contagion.

Turban has  been critical of the geosocial networking application Grindr, and argued in Vox that the app may have detrimental effects on the mental health of gay men. He has complained that Grindr does not do enough to keep minors off of their platform, and that this may pose sexual risk to young people. His opinion piece for The New York Times about minors on Grindr was one of several LGBT articles that were conspicuously censored with large white boxes in The New York Times print edition in Qatar.

References 

Transgender and medicine
LGBT and suicide
Gay academics
Mental health in the United States
Harvard University alumni
Yale School of Medicine alumni
Harvard Medical School staff
Gender identity
Year of birth missing (living people)
Living people
LGBT physicians
21st-century American physicians